Euxoa costata is a moth of the family Noctuidae. It is found in British Columbia, south into the north-western United States where it is abundant in the ponderosa pine forests east of the Cascade Mountains.

The wingspan is about 34 mm.

References 

Euxoa
Moths of North America
Moths described in 1876